AFC Bournemouth Under-21s and Academy are the youth teams of Bournemouth. The reserve team is made up of under-21 players and is effectively Bournemouth's second-string side. They play in The Central League's Southeast Division and contest the Central League Cup. The under-18 players, among other younger age groups, make up the Academy team. They play in the Youth Alliance League's Southwest Division and contest the Youth Alliance Cup.

Home fixtures for both sides are contested at the Canford Park Arena in Wimborne, Bournemouth.

Under-21s

Out on loan

U21 Honours

Leagues

Cups

Regional
Hampshire Senior Cup 
Runners-up: 2017

Under-18s

Out on loan

U18 Honours

Leagues
Youth Alliance South-West Division
Winners: 2014–15

Cups
Youth Alliance Cup 
Winners: 2016–17

Notable products
Bournemouth's Academy has produced numerous players throughout its history who have gone on to make professional appearances during their careers – be it for Bournemouth or another professional side.

The following is a list of those players ordered by the year they signed their first professional contract with the club. Appearances and goals are for Bournemouth only. Players highlighted in bold are still currently contracted to the club.

Players who have played at international level
A number of players who have come through the youth ranks at Bournemouth have also represented their country at both senior and youth levels. The following is a list of those players and their respective appearance and goal records.

References

External links
 Bournemouth Under-21s at afcb.co.uk
 Bournemouth Under-18s at afcb.co.uk

The Central League
Academy
Football academies in England